Montjuïc Cemetery, known in Catalan as Cementiri del Sud-oest or Cementiri de Montjuïc, is located on one of the rocky slopes of Montjuïc hill in Barcelona.

History

It was opened on 17 March 1883 by the city of Barcelona as its main cemetery, supplanting the older cemetery at Poblenou in the east. It now contains over one million burials and cremation ashes in 150,000 plots, niches and mausolea and is operated by Cementiris de Barcelona S.A.

The city became heavily industrialised during the 19th century and its economic growth led Barcelona becoming the centre of Catalonia and a major city of Spain. The growth in population led to an increased demand for burial facilities, and a location was chosen on the slopes of Montjuïc, away from the pressures of housing development. The steep slopes of the hillside give Montjuïc its special character, with winding paths and terraced niches looking seawards over the harbour.

The cemetery contains one Commonwealth war grave, British Army Private Charles Hill (d. 1941) of the Queen's Own Cameron Highlanders who died during World War II.

Monument design
The timing of the cemetery and its memorials coincided with several artistic and design movements; its early monuments are inspired by classic and Gothic styles, while those of the Fin de siècle exhibit the influence of the Art-Nouveau design movement. In Catalonia that style developed into Modernisme, as it was known in the Catalan language.

Notable interments 
 Isaac Albéniz (1860–1909), virtuoso pianist, composer, and conductor
 Victoria de los Ángeles (1923–2005), operatic lyric soprano and recitalist
 Jacint Verdaguer (1845–1902) writer, regarded as one of the greatest poets of Catalan literature and a prominent literary figure of the Renaixença, a cultural revival movement of the late Romantic era
 Francisco Ascaso (1901–1936), anarchist
 Hans Beimler (1895–1936), active member of the German Communist Party and a deputy in the Reichstag
 Joaquín Blume (1933–1959), gymnast
 Francesc Cambó (1876–1947),  politician, founder and leader of the autonomist party Lliga Regionalista
 Josep Carner (1884–1970), poet, journalist, playwright and translator
 Ramon Casas (1866–1932), artist
 Ildefonso Cerdá (1815–1876), architect who designed the 19th-century "extension" of Barcelona called the Eixample
 Lluís Companys (1882–1940), President of Catalonia from 1934 and during the Spanish Civil War
 Buenaventura Durruti (1896–1936), anarchist revolutionary in the Spanish Civil War
 Antonio Escobar (1879–1940), Army general 
 Josep Lluís Facerías (1920–1957), politician 
 Jaume Ferran i Clua (1851–1929), microbiologist 
 Francesc Ferrer i Guàrdia (1859–1909), anarchist pedagogue
 Joan Gamper (1877–1930), Swiss football pioneer, versatile athlete and club president
 Àngel Guimerà (1845–1924), writer 
 Francesc Layret (1880–1920), politician 
 Anselmo Lorenzo (1841–1914), politician and anarchist 
 Francesc Macià (1859–1933), First President of Catalonia and formerly an officer in the Spanish Army 
 Pascual Madoz (1806–1870), politician, statistician 
 Enriqueta Martí (1868–1913), Spanish child serial killer, kidnapper, and procuress of children 
 Ana María Matute (1925–2014), writer 
 Raquel Meller (1888–1962), diseuse, cuplé, and tonadilla singer and actress 
 Lluís Millet (1867–1941), composer, musician and co-founder of Orfeó Català 
 Joan Miró (1893–1983), artist 
 Federico Mompou (1893–1987), composer and pianist 
 Joan Salvat-Papasseit (1894–1924), poet 
 Ángel Pestaña (1886–1937), politician 
 Marcelo H. del Pilar (1850–1896), Filipino propagandist and writer. His remains were exhumed and brought back to the Philippines on December 3, 1920.
 José María de Porcioles (1904–1993), mayor of Barcelona, Catalonia  
 Enric Prat de la Riba (1870–1917), politician  
 Salvador Puig Antich (1948–1974), revolutionary, militant anarchist   
 Francisco de Paula Rius y Taulet (1833–1890), politician, mayor of Barcelona in four different non-consecutive periods during the Restoration   
 Montserrat Roig (1946–1991), writer   
 Constantino Romero (1947–2013), TV and radio host and actor    
 Carlos Ruiz Zafón (1964–2020), novelist
 Santiago Rusiñol (1861–1931),  painter, poet, and playwright    
 Josep Maria de Sagarra (1894–1961), writer    
 Salvador Seguí Rubinat (1887–1923), anarchist     
 Jacinto Verdaguer (1845–1902), writer, poet      
 Ricardo Zamora (1901–1978), Spanish footballer

See also 

 Burials at Montjuïc Cemetery
 Poblenou Cemetery

References

External links 

 Essay on Barcelona's graveyard

1883 establishments in Spain
Cemeteries in Catalonia
Buildings and structures in Barcelona
Sants-Montjuïc
Tourist attractions in Barcelona
Modernisme architecture in Barcelona
Modernisme sculpture
Art Nouveau cemeteries
Commonwealth War Graves Commission cemeteries in Spain